The Tremont Stakes is a Listed American Thoroughbred horse race run annually for two-year-olds over the distance of 5½ furlongs on the dirt in early June at Belmont Park in Elmont, New York. The event carries a purse of US$150,000.

History
First held in 1887, it is named for the horse Tremont, who, according to the New York Racing Association, was acclaimed by 19th Century horse racing historians as the best two-year-old ever bred in the United States.  It was first run at the Gravesend Race Track at Coney Island in Brooklyn until 1910 when racing was no longer viable after the New York State Legislature passed the Hart–Agnew Law which outlawed all racetrack betting. Although the law was repealed in time to resume racing in 1913, the Gravesend Racetrack never reopened. The Tremont Stakes was restarted in 1914.

The race was not run in 1911–1913, 1933–1935 and 2009–2013.

It is the first stakes race on the Belmont Park stakes schedule for two-year-old colts.

In 1975, E. Rodriguez Tizol brought his colt Bold Forbes from the El Comandante racetrack in Puerto Rico to compete against top horses at the big tracks in New York. He made his first start in the Tremont Stakes and won easily won by five lengths while setting a new stakes record of 1:09 2/5 for six furlongs that still stands through 2018. In his first full season in the United States, Bold Forbes would be voted the 1976 Eclipse Award as the American Champion Three-Year-Old Male Horse.

Grade
Although the Tremont Stake is currently ungraded, after the grading of races came into effect in 1973 it earned Grade III status for 1981–1996 and 1999–2003. In earlier years it was a very important New York race for two-year-olds and was won by some of the great names in Thoroughbred racing such as U.S. Racing Hall of Fame inductees Man o' War, Sarazen, Buckpasser, Foolish Pleasure, and Alydar.

The race was usually held in early June.

Due to the troubled economy in 2008, the Tremont was canceled by the NYRA as they adjusted races to meet the new Grade I standard purse of $300,000.   It was reinstated in 2014 in mid June at the same distance. In 2015, the date for the race was moved to the Friday before the Belmont Stakes as part of the Belmont Racing Festival.

Venue
The Tremont Stakes has also been run at the following tracks 
 Gravesend Race Track – 1887 to 1910
 Aqueduct Racetrack – 1914 to 1955, 1960 to 1974
 Jamaica Race Course – 1956, 1958, 1976

Race distances
 5 furlongs : 1936–1939
 5½ furlongs : 1940, 1973, 1989–2008, 2014–present
 5¾ furlongs : 1901–1910
 6 furlongs : 1887- 1900, 1914–1932, 1974–1988

Records
Speed record:
 5 furlongs : Gannet, 0:58.60 (1939)
 5½ furlongs : More Than Ready, 1:02.56 (1999)
 5¾ furlongs : Fayette, 1:09.60 (1908)
 6 furlongs : Bold Forbes, 1:09.40 (1975)

Most wins by a jockey:
 6 – John Velazquez (1999, 2001, 2003, 2006, 2007, 2014, 2016)

Most wins by a trainer:
 5 – James E. Fitzsimmons (1927, 1932, 1948, 1952, 1953)
 5 – Todd Pletcher (1999, 2003, 2006, 2007, 2016)

Most wins by an owner:
 5 – Wheatley Stable (1927, 1952, 1953, 1964, 1966)

Winners
 Tremont Stakes history and chart at the NYRA:

 In 1970 there was a Dead heat for the win.

References

1887 establishments in New York (state)
Horse races in New York (state)
Gravesend Race Track
Jamaica Race Course
Belmont Park
Flat horse races for two-year-olds
Previously graded stakes races in the United States
Sports in Long Island
Recurring sporting events established in 1887